is a Japanese actor.

Izumi was born in Hiroshima, Japan in 1988. He started Javelin throw when he was in high school, and placed 4th in Hiroshima prefecture and 8th in Chugoku Area.
While studying in the University of Central Arkansas, he broke school record and received athletic scholarship until his graduation. He participated in the United States ARMY ROTC and received basic military leadership training such as Land Navigation, Field Operation Training, Water Survival Training, Rappelling, and Firearms Training. He also completed the Emergency Medical Technician training at the local fire station, and Advanced Life-support training at the Tokyo Fire Department.

In 2012, Izumi started his acting career after his graduation of Graduate School.

He is best known for his roles as Carlito in the drama Angel Heart which is the after story of City Hunter written by Tsukasa Hojo.

Filmography

Television
 IRYU SOSA Season2 (TV Asahi, 2012)
 Taira no Kiyomori (NHK, 2012)
 IRYU SOSA Season3 as Satoshi Shiomi (TV Asahi, 2013, Episode 3)
 Nirai Kanai no Kataribe (ABC, 2013)
 Tokusou Saizensen 2013 as Oyama (TV Asahi, 2013)
 Kaiki Daisakusen (NHK-BS, 2013)
 Specialist 2 as Yuki Nagamine (TV Asahi, 2014)
 TEAM as Hayashi (TV Asahi, 2014, Episode 6)
 Hanasaki Mai Speaks Out as Jyunichi Kameda (Nippon TV, 2014, Final Episode)
 Inochi Arukagiri Tatakae soshite Ikinukunda as Toshinao Takagi (Fuji TV, 2014)
 Women won't allow it as Masato Hirata (TBS TV, 2014, Episode 9&10)
 ORANGE as Satoshi Naito (TBS-TV, 2015)
 Saigo no Shonin as Akira Miyake (TV Asahi, 2015)
 Deiri Kinshi no Onna as Tatsuya Ariyoshi (TV Asahi, 2015, Episode 5)
 SCOOP as Syunsuke Sasaki (TBS-TV, 2015)
 Kage no Chitai as Ryoichi Kusakabe (TBS-TV, 2015)
 Hanasaki Mai Speaks Out Season2 as Naoki Kase (Nippon TV, 2015)
 Angel Heart as Carlito (Nippon TV, 2015)
 Kenji no Shimei as Jyunichi Mabuchi (TV Asahi, 2016)
 Specialist as Takumi Ayuhara (TV Asahi, 2016)
 Shizumanu Taiyō as Katsuki Onchi (WOWOW, 2016)
 Guard Center 24 as Minegishi (Nippon TV, 2016)
 OMIYASAN Special2 as Keichiro Nishi (TV Asahi, 2016)
 Kenji no Honkai as Tetsuaki Koyama (TV Asahi, 2016)
 Zenigata Keibu as Wataru Takasugi (WOWOW, 2017)
 Shacho shitsuno Fuyu as Oonishi (WOWOW, 2017)
 IRYU SOSA Season4 as Nobuhiko Takase (TV Asahi, 2017)
 Temisu no Tsurugi as Nonomura (TV Tokyo, 2017)

Films
 Niryu Shosetsuka -The Serialist (TOEI, 2013)

Stage
 SANADA JUYUSHI (2013) 
 9days Queen as Robert Kett (2014)
 Shakespeare Monogatari as Adam (2016-2017)
 Chiruran as Keisuke Yamanami (2017)

Ability and licenses
Bilingual in English and Japanese 
TOEIC 900/990
KODOKAN JUDO First-degree Black Belt

References

External links
Official profile on Zero Light-Years

1988 births
Living people
Male voice actors from Hiroshima
Japanese male film actors
Japanese male television actors
Japanese male voice actors
Actors from Hiroshima